An unconditional surrender is a surrender without conditions except for those provided by international law.

Unconditional surrender may also refer to:
Unconditional Surrender (novel), a 1961 novel by Evelyn Waugh
Unconditional Surrender (sculpture), a 2005 statue by John Seward Johnson II
Ulysses S. Grant (1822–1885), nickname Unconditional Surrender Grant, the 18th president of the United States